Raisi (also Romanized as Ra’īsī; also known as Rīsī) is a village in Eshqabad Rural District, Miyan Jolgeh District, Nishapur County, Razavi Khorasan Province, Iran. At the 2006 census, its population was 901, in 222 families.

References 

Populated places in Nishapur County